Machhlishahr is a town in Jaunpur district in the Indian state of Uttar Pradesh. It is situated 30 km west of district headquarters Jaunpur. NH-231 passes through the city. Machhlishahr – Janghai – Bhadohi four-lane highway is under construction which will boost the economy of the region. Machhlishahr is a Nagar panchayat and there has been a longstanding demand for making it a Nagar palika parishad. In 2020, Machhalisahar nagar panchayat has secured 33rd all India rank in Swachh Survekshan cleanliness survey.

Geography

It has an average elevation of 84 metres (275 feet). It has been assigned 222143 pincode by Indian postal services.

Demographics
As of 2011 Indian Census, Machhlishahr had a total population of 26,107, of which 13,284 were males and 12,823 were females. Population within the age group of 0 to 6 years was 3,886. The total number of literates in Machhlishahr was 17,205, which constituted 65.9% of the population with male literacy of 71.0% and female literacy of 60.6%. The effective literacy rate of 7+ population of Machhlishahr was 77.4%, of which male literacy rate was 83.8% and female literacy rate was 70.9%. The Scheduled Castes population was 1,841. Machhlishahr had 3740 households in 2011.

 India census, Machhlishahr had a population of 22‚943. Males constitute 51.5% of the population and females 48.5%. Literacy rate is Machhlishahr city is 58.3%.

Government and politics

Members of Parliament
1952: Ganapati Ram, Indian National Congress
1957: Ganapati Ram, Indian National Congress
1962: Ganapati Ram, Indian National Congress
1967: Nageshwar Dwivedi, Indian National Congress
1971: Nageshwar Dwivedi, Indian National Congress
1977: Raj Keshar Singh, Janata Party
1980: Sheo Sharan Verma, Janata Dal
1984: Sri Pati Mishra, Indian National Congress
1989: Sheo Sharan Verma, Janata Dal
1991: Sheo Sharan Verma, Janata Dal
1998: Chinmayanand, Bhartiya Janata Party
1999: Chandra Nath Singh, Samajwadi Party
2004: Umakant Yadav, Bahujan Samaj Party
2009: Tufani Saroj, Samajwadi Party
2014: Ram Charitra Nishad, Bhartiya Janata Party
2019: B. P. Saroj, Bharatiya Janata Party

Notable people
 Salaam Machhalishahari, Indian Urdu-language Ghazal and Nazm writer
 Mata Prasad, former Governor, Arunachal Pradesh

See also
Achakari

References

External links

Cities and towns in Jaunpur district